Tarnawce  is a village in the administrative district of Gmina Krasiczyn, within Przemyśl County, Subcarpathian Voivodeship, in south-eastern Poland.

The village has a population of 440.

References

Tarnawce